USS Romeo was a sternwheel steamer that saw service as a tinclad warship during the American Civil War.  Completed in August 1862 for civilian trade on the Wabash River, she was instead purchased by the Union Navy for military service in October.  Commissioned in December, she cleared naval mines on the Yazoo River later that month before participating in the operations against Confederate-held Fort Hindman in January 1863.  After the fall of Fort Hindman, Romeo was part of an expedition up the White River.  In February and March 1863, she was part of the Yazoo Pass Expedition, and she fought with Confederates at river landings later in the year to help isolate Vicksburg, Mississippi, during the Vicksburg campaign.

Later in 1863, Romeo served on the White, Little Red, and Tennessee Rivers.  During February 1864, she was part of an expedition up the Yazoo River to Yazoo City, Mississippi, and then spent most of the rest of the war patrolling on the Mississippi River.  During this time patrolling, she had multiple encounters with Confederate land forces.  By April and May 1865, the war was ending, and Romeo was declared surplus on May 29.  Decommissioned on June 30, she was sold on August 17 and was then used in the merchant trade.  At some point in her civilian career, she was converted into a sidewheel steamer. Romeo ceased to appear in the shipping registers in 1870.

Construction and characteristics
In mid-1862, with the American Civil War ongoing, the Union Navy authorized Commodore Joseph B. Hull to purchase civilian vessels for conversion into military warships.  Some of these civilian ships were converted into tinclad warships, a process that involved building a wooden casemate and then at least partially covering it with thin metal armor for protection, reinforcing certain internal structures, removing the existing pilothouse and installing a new armored one, adding cannons as armament, and generally removing the texas.  One of the vessels purchased by Hull was Romeo, who was bought at Cincinnati, Ohio, on October 31, 1862, at a cost of $17,459.  Romeo had been completed in August 1862 at Brownsville, Pennsylvania, for John I. Rhoades, who was also the owner of a vessel that became USS Juliet. Romeo had been earmarked for trade use on the Wabash River when she was built.  The process of preparing her for military service occurred at Cairo, Illinois.

A sternwheel steamer, power was provided by two steam engines fed by a total of two boilers. Romeo was reported to have a speed of  when going upstream. Originally armed with six 24-pounder howitzers, by July 1864 she had two additional 24-pounders, but by the end of September was back down to six.

Service history

Fort Hindman
Romeo was commissioned on December 11, 1862, and was placed under the command of Acting Ensign Robert B. Smith.  The next day, she moved downriver to Helena, Arkansas, in order to join the Mississippi River Squadron.  On December 21, she left Helena, and then moved up the Yazoo River along with other vessels in support of a Union Army attempt to capture Confederate-held Vicksburg, Mississippi.  From December 23 until December 26, Romeo cleared naval mines from the Yazoo River.  It then spent through January 3, 1863, operating on the Yazoo and its tributaries, patrolling the area and skirmishing with Confederate land forces. On December 29, 1862, Romeo joined the tinclad USS Marmora in moving up the Old River to shell Confederate positions near Vicksburg.  The Union Army's campaign failed, and the naval vessels were withdrawn on January 3, 1863.  The next day, Romeo was assigned to a naval force commanded by Lieutenant Commander Watson Smith that was intended to be part of a joint army-navy expedition against Confederate Fort Hindman in Arkansas.

After moving to the mouth of the White River, the Union flotilla, accompanied by troop transports, ascended the White on January 8, and then took a cutoff that led into the Arkansas River.  On January 10, army forces assaulted the fort, while some of the Union vessels provided supporting fire; the Confederates surrendered the next day.  January 12 saw the ironclads USS Baron de Kalb and USS Cincinnati move up the White River, in conjunction with an army movement towards St. Charles, Arkansas.  Romeo was sent upriver after the two ironclads, bearing supplies.  When St. Charles was reached, it was found that the Confederates had abandoned it, taking two cannons with them on a transport vessel.  Baron de Kalb, Romeo, a loaded troop transport, and the tinclad USS Forest Rose, continued upstream in pursuit of the transport.  The expedition reached DeValls Bluff on January 17, where they captured two cannon, 200 small arms, and some prisoners.  The next day, Des Arc was reached, where prisoners, ammunition, and corn were taken.  The Union force then turned back downriver, destroying much of St. Charles on the way.

Vicksburg and Yazoo City

Romeo returned to the Yazoo River on February 6, 1863, and then participated in the Yazoo Pass Expedition.  As part of the expedition, she was involved in the fighting along the Fort Pemberton area on the Tallahatchie River from March 11 through 23. During the expedition, Romeo had both of her chimneys knocked off. On April 18, Acting Volunteer Lieutenant John V. Johnston was transferred to Romeo to take command of the vessel.  In late April, Romeo was part of a feint designed to draw Confederate attention from the primary Union movement further downstream at Grand Gulf, Mississippi.  Through the rest of the Vicksburg campaign, Romeo provided naval support, engaging Confederate troops at river landings to help cut off the city.  On May 19, once Union land forces had reached the vicinity of Vicksburg, Romeo was part of a Union naval force that ascended the Yazoo River to open up contact with the army positions. The next day, she returned to the Mississippi River.  June 6 saw the appearance of Romeo and the tinclad USS Petrel play a role in causing Confederate forces to abandon a planned assault on Young's Point. In mid-June, the tinclads were assigned identifying numbers to be painted on their pilothouses; Romeo was given the number 3.  On June 29, she fired on Confederate raiding forces in a stage of the Battle of Goodrich's Landing.  Late on July 2, Confederate forces in the Donaldsonville, Louisiana, area deployed an artillery battery to ambush Union shipping.  Not long after deploying, the transport Iberville came past the ambush point.  Confederate artillery fire disabled Iberville, but Romeo then passed through the area escorting another transport.  The two transports were able to escape while Romeo engaged the battery.

Romeo then participated in operations that involved service on the White and Little Red Rivers.  A station report by the Mississippi River Squadron reported Romeo to be on the White River as of August 1.  Later that month she was reported to be leaking and in poor condition.  An inspection on September 24 revealed that Romeo needed repairs to her machinery and capstan, and that water was accumulating in her hold. The inspectors believed her condition to be so poor that repairs at a dry dock would be necessary. In October she was transferred to the Tennessee River. In early November, Romeo captured six Confederates at the landing at Perryville, Tennessee.  On November 12, Romeo was released from duty on the Tennessee River, as she was no longer needed for convoy duties, and later that month she was sent back to Cairo before returning to the Tennessee River the next month.  By January 1864, she was back on the Mississippi River, being stationed near Bolivar, Mississippi, and on January 15 was reported to be commanded by Acting Master T. Baldwin.  On February 2, Romeo re-entered the Yazoo River, as part of a squadron commanded by Lieutenant Commander Elias K. Owen that also included the tinclads USS Exchange, Marmora, USS Prairie Bird, and Petrel.  Owen's command was to cooperate with an army brigade commanded by Colonel James H. Coates.  The expedition fought a minor skirmish with Confederate forces near Satartia, Mississippi, that day before facing heavier resistance near Liverpool the next day.  Romeo was struck by small arms fire in the fighting at Liverpool, but suffered no damage.  On February 4, the column reached a mill  from Yazoo City.  Most of the force remained in the area of the mill while Exchange and Marmora continued on to Yazoo City, which they found held by Confederate forces.  The next day, the expedition withdrew to Satartia.  After the Meridian campaign drew Confederate troops away from the Yazoo City area, the Union forces occupied the place on February 9.

Later service
By late February 1864, Romeo was no longer stationed in the Yazoo City area.  In May, she was assigned to the area between Vicksburg and Natchez, Mississippi, for patrolling purposes, although she also patrolled as far as the mouth of the Arkansas River.  She continued in this duty for most of the rest of the war.  On May 24, Confederate artillery opened fire on the tinclad USS Curlew from the banks of the Mississippi River in Arkansas. The artillery left when the timberclad USS Tyler approached the area, and Curlew moved upriver to join Romeo.  Together, the two tinclads would escort the transport Nicholas Longworth downriver.  Curlew had a machinery failure on the way, and was left behind.  Near Columbia, Arkansas, Romeo and Nicholas Longworth came under artillery fire.  Romeo fought with the Confederates, while Nicholas Longworth continued on downriver.  However, the transport came under more Confederate fire.  Romeo ran out of ammunition and had to return to where Curlew had been left behind to pick up more.  Together, Romeo and the transport were able to make it downriver to Greenville, Mississippi, although they had suffered damage to the hull and upper structure.  Two vessels from the Mississippi Marine Brigade escorted the transport downriver, while Romeo returned to Columbia for repairs.  Confederate artillery also returned to Columbia, and further damaged Romeo.  In early July, Romeos boilers were reported to be in poor condition.  Later that month, a patrol from Romeo captured a Confederate officer who had been on the staff of John S. Marmaduke, although he later escaped from another vessel by jumping overboard.

In August, Romeo intervened when Confederate artillery and cavalry badly damaged and almost captured the packet steamer Empress, driving off the Confederate forces and escorting the packet steamer to safety. Owen did not approve of Baldwin's handling of this situation, stating that he believed "a more competent person ought to be placed in command of the Romeo", and that Baldwin was "entirely too old and too unused to a naval life".  On September 30, Romeo was fired on by a group of Confederate guerrillas.  No Union sailors were injured, and fire from the vessel drove off the Confederates.  Two crewmen from Romeo were captured in March 1865; Acting Rear Admiral Samuel Phillips Lee attributed the loss to a lack of carefulness on the part of Baldwin.  Towards the end of the war, Romeo was briefly assigned to the Ohio River; this had happened by mid-April. In late April, Romeo was one of the vessels earmarked to patrol portions of the Mississippi River where fleeing Confederate president Jefferson Davis was expected to try to cross the river; Davis was eventually captured in Georgia in May.  Romeo returned to Cairo in May.  By April and May, the war was winding down with a Confederate defeat, and by May 29, Romeo was one of a number of vessels reported to be surplus.  On June 30, she was decommissioned, while stationed at Mound City, Illinois.  She was laid up in ordinary, and Acting Volunteer Lieutenant Joseph G. Megler was assigned to take charge of her while she awaited sale.  On August 17, she was sold at auction for $7,100.  During her time in military service, she had required $11,524.98 in repair costs.  After her sale, she was used in the merchant trade, and was eventually converted into a sidewheel steamer.  In 1870, she ceased to appear in the shipping registers.

References

Sources
 
  Note: ISBN printed in book is 0-89029-516-3.
 

 
 
 
 
 
 
 
 

Steamships of the United States Navy
Ships built in Brownsville, Pennsylvania
Ships of the Union Navy
Gunboats of the United States Navy
1862 ships
Merchant ships of the United States